KVDU (104.1 FM, "104.1 The Spot") is a commercial adult hits radio station licensed to Houma, Louisiana; it has announced intentions to change the city of license to the nearby city of Gonzales. Owned by iHeartMedia, Inc., the station serving both the New Orleans and Baton Rouge metropolitan areas. The KVDU studios are located in the Central Business District of New Orleans, while the transmitter resides in nearby South Vacherie.

History 
When 104.1 originally signed on the air on November 15, 1968, it was KHOM, with the call sign reflecting its Houma city of license.  It broadcast from a 350-foot antenna, only targeting the Houma area.

In 1989, it moved its transmitter atop the 2,000-foot tower in Vacherie used by WCKW-FM (now WZRH).  That allowed the signal to penetrate into the New Orleans and Baton Rouge markets.  The more-powerful signal could also be heard in Lafayette, Louisiana, and even some counties in Mississippi. The station remained licensed to Houma, but dropped its middle of the road radio format for oldies.

In late 1994, after WEZB ended its Top 40 format in favor of Hot Talk, KHOM owner, Raymond A. Saadi decided to switch formats to Top 40 as "Mix 104.1." The station kept the heritage KHOM call letters for several years, then in 1998, changed them to KUMX to reflect the "Mix" identity.  In February 1997, the station was bought by iHeartMedia, then known as Clear Channel Communications, for $8.75 million. Clear Channel also acquired other FM stations in the New Orleans market, acquiring urban contemporary WQUE-FM, urban adult contemporary WYLD-FM, country music WNOE-FM, and alternative rock KKND (now KMEZ). Under Clear Channel ownership, KUMX ran a small play list, stressing repeated airing of the biggest current hits.

The move to Top 40 paid off in the ratings until 2000, when WEZB evolved back to its original Top 40 format. On June 29, 2001, at 6 a.m., "Mix" signed off with "When It's Over" by Sugar Ray. It then began stunting by playing only construction sound effects.  At 5 p.m. that day, it debuted a classic rock format as "104-1 The Fox," under the new call sign KFXN-FM. The new format launched with an "All Beatles Weekend", beginning with "Sgt. Pepper's Lonely Hearts Club Band."

On July 26, 2002, the station returned to Top 40 music as the adult-leaning "104.1 KISS-FM," under the new call sign KSTE-FM.  However, "KISS-FM" did not catch on in the ratings. By November 2003, the format shifted to Rhythmic Top 40, then flipped to an urban gospel in July 2005 as "Hallelujah 104.1," under new call letters KHEV.

After 16 months in the gospel format, Clear Channel decided to replace it with active rock on November 13, 2006, and in the process, inherited "The Rock of New Orleans" slogan from sister station WRNO-FM, which on the same day dropped its heritage rock/classic rock format for all-talk.  On November 20, 2006, Clear Channel replaced the KHEV call sign with new call letters KYRK.

On July 1, 2010 at 3 p.m., after playing "It's The End of the World As We Know It (And I Feel Fine)" by R.E.M., KYRK changed its format back to classic rock, this time branded as "104.1 The Brew".  The first song on "The Brew" was "You Shook Me All Night Long" by AC/DC.  The station's former active rock format was moved to its HD2 signal at that time. On July 19, 2010, KYRK changed call letters to KOBW to go with "The Brew" branding. "The Brew" was positioned as "Classic Rock for a New Generation", which played mostly late 60s, 70s, 80s, and early 90s classic rock tracks.
364 days later, on June 30, 2011, at Noon, after again playing "It's The End of the World As We Know It", KOBW changed its format to a "GenX"-type adult top 40 format as "Voodoo 104", with an emphasis on retro-themed hits from the late 1980s, 1990s and early 2000s, along with current hits, under the slogan "Retro, Rock, Dance, & Everything in Between". The first song on "Voodoo" was "Let's Get It Started" by The Black Eyed Peas. The following day, KOBW changed its call letters to KVDU to go with the "Voodoo 104" branding.

At the beginning of 2012, KVDU began shifting towards a conventional Adult Top 40 direction with most of the retro and "Gen X" songs being reduced and more currents being played, along with mixing rhythmic-leaning hits with Hot AC tracks.  By early 2014, the station dropped the "Retro, Rock, Dance, & Everything in Between" slogan in favor of the new slogan "90s to Now."

On August 22, 2017 at 5 p.m., after playing "Say You Won't Let Go" by James Arthur, KVDU flipped to a rock-leaning adult hits format, branded as "104.1 The Spot." The first song on "The Spot" was "I Won't Back Down" by Tom Petty.  The station uses the slogan "We Play Anything."

During the impact of Hurricane Ida in August 2021, KVDU's tower, shared with WZRH, was destroyed as a result of high winds, knocking out the station's terrestrial broadcast (although the format would still run through their stream on the iHeartRadio app) until the station was able to find a temporary transmitter. It would not find a permanent new transmitter location until March of the following year, when it announced to the FCC their intentions to change the city of license to Gonzales; this would also have the effect of moving the station itself closer to Baton Rouge.

References

External links
Official website

Radio stations in New Orleans
Radio stations established in 1968
1968 establishments in Louisiana
IHeartMedia radio stations